Shiroma (written: 白間 or 城間) is a Japanese surname. Notable people with the surname include:

, Japanese politician
, Japanese singer

Japanese-language surnames